Herwig Walker (born 4 May 1972) is an Austrian former footballer who is last known to have played as a goalkeeper for LASK.

Career

Walker started his career with Austrian second division side SV Spittal. In 1992, Walker signed for LASK in the Austrian top flight, where he made over 22 league appearances and scored 0 goals. In 1996, he signed for Austrian second division club Vorwärts Steyr, helping them earn promotion to the Austrian top flight. In 1999, Walker signed for Watford in the English Premier League. In 2000, he returned to Austrian third division team SV Spittal. In 2001, he returned to LASK in the Austrian second division.

References

External links

 

Austrian footballers
Watford F.C. players
Expatriate footballers in England
Austrian expatriate footballers
Austrian expatriate sportspeople in England
Austrian Football Bundesliga players
2. Liga (Austria) players
LASK players
SV Spittal players
Living people
1972 births
Association football goalkeepers
SK Vorwärts Steyr players